Giles Edwin Dawson (4 March 1903 – 26 August 1994) was a 20th-century Shakespearean scholar, paleographer, and librarian.

Life 
Born in Columbus, Ohio, the son of noted American ornithologist William Leon Dawson and Frances Etta Akerman. Dawson graduated from Oberlin College in 1925 and went on to earn an MA and PhD from Cornell University. He served on the faculty of the University of North Dakota and the Case Western Reserve University in Cleveland before joining the Folger Shakespeare Library as a reference librarian in 1932.

Dawson served in the U. S. Navy in World War II. From 1946 until his retirement in 1967, he was the curator of books and manuscripts for the Folger. He was a member of the Catholic University faculty from 1935 to 1972, lecturing to graduate students until 1967. He also taught at Howard University from 1975 to 1977. From 1984 until May 1994, he volunteered as the rare-book librarian for the Washington National Cathedral.

Family 
Dawson married Margaret Williams in 1926. They had two children. She died in 1957. Two years later he married Margaret White, with whom he had three children.

Major works 
July and Julian. Ed. with Arthur Brown. Malone Society Reprints, 1955
Life of William Shakespeare. Folger Shakespeare Library, 1958
Four Centuries of Shakespeare Publication. University of Kansas Press, 1964
Records of plays and players in Kent, 1450-1642. Malone Society Collections, Vol. 7, Oxford University Press, 1965
Elizabethan Handwriting, 1500–1650: A Guide to the Reading of Documents. with Laetitia Kennedy-Skipton. W. W. Norton and Company, 1966
"A Seventh Signature for Shakespeare". Shakespeare Quarterly 43 (Spring 1992): 72–79, p. 79

References
"Giles E. Dawson, 91, Dies; Authority on Shakespeare". Obituary. The Washington Post, 29 August 1994, D4, col. 1.

External links
Four Centuries of Shakespeare Publication (1964). KU Scholarworks.

Shakespearean scholars
Cornell University alumni
Rare book librarians
Folger Shakespeare Library
1903 births
1994 deaths